157 (Welsh) Regiment RLC is an Army Reserve regiment of the Royal Logistic Corps.

History
The regiment was formed in the Royal Corps of Transport as 157th (Wales and Midlands) Transport Regiment, RCT (Volunteers) in 1967. 224 Squadron was formed in 1969. The regiment was renamed 157th (Wales and Midlands) Transport Regiment, RCT (Volunteers) in 1987 and 157th (Wales and Midlands) Transport Regiment, RLC (Volunteers) in 1993. 580 Squadron was formed and HQ Squadron was re-designated 249 Squadron later that year. The regiment was-renamed 157th (Wales and Midlands) Logistic Support Regiment, RLC (Volunteers) in 1999 and 157th (Wales and Midlands) Transport Regiment, RLC (Volunteers) in 2006.

Structure
The regiment's structure is:
Regimental Headquarters, at Maindy Barracks, Cardiff
249 Headquarters Squadron, at Maindy Barracks, Cardiff
223 Transport Squadron, in Swansea
224 Transport Squadron, in Carmarthen
A Troop, in Haverfordwest
398 Transport Squadron, in Queensferry
580 Transport Squadron, at Maindy Barracks, Cardiff

Battle Honours

FISHGUARD.  This was awarded to the Pembroke Yeomanry (Castlemartin) in 1853 to reflect the Regiment's involvement in the last invasion of Britain by the French in 1797.  This honour is carried forward to the Welsh Transport Regiment by 224 (Pembroke Yeomanry) Squadron.

References

Citations

Bibliography
 The Last Invasion of Britain by E.H. Stewart-James

External links
157 (Welsh) Regiment RLC

Regiments of the Royal Logistic Corps